Darin Scott  is an American film and TV producer. He also co-directed the film Tales from the Hood 2. He initially studied to be a chemical engineer at USC. He won an MTV Movie & TV Award for Best Movie of the Year, for his 1993 effort Menace II Society.

Filmography
 From a Whisper to a Scream (1987)
 Stepfather II (1989)
 To Sleep with Anger (1990)
 Fear of a Black Hat (1993)
 Menace II Society (1993)
 Love and a .45 (1994)
 Tales from the Hood (1995)
 Sprung (1997)
 Caught Up (1998), directed
 The Brothers (2001)
 Femme Fatales (2012, TV), consulting
 The Failing Man (2012, TV)
 The Kill Corporation (2014, TV)
 Tales from the Hood 2 (2018), also co-directed
 American Nightmares (2018)

References

American film producers
Year of birth missing (living people)
Living people

External links